The Gay Deceiver is a 1926 film directed by John M. Stahl. The film stars Lew Cody and Carmel Myers. The film is considered lost.

Plot
A deceiver leads the fast set in Paris and is involved in love affairs and blackmail until he mends his way for his daughter's sake.

Cast
 Lew Cody as Toto / Antoine di Tillois
 Malcolm McGregor as Robert Le Rivarol
 Marceline Day as Louise de Tillois
 Carmel Myers as Countess de Sano
 Roy D'Arcy as Count de Sano
 Dorothy Phillips as Claire
 Edward Connelly - Merinville, the lawyer
 Tony D'Algy as Merinville's nephew

References

External links

1926 films
1926 romantic drama films
American romantic drama films
American silent feature films
American black-and-white films
Films directed by John M. Stahl
Lost American films
Metro-Goldwyn-Mayer films
American films based on plays
Films set in France
1926 lost films
Lost drama films
1920s American films
Silent romantic drama films
Silent American drama films